The 2N3906 is a commonly used PNP bipolar junction transistor intended for general purpose low-power amplifying or switching applications. It is designed for low electric current and power and medium voltage, and can operate at moderately high speeds. It is complementary to the 2N3904 NPN transistor. Both types were registered by Motorola Semiconductor in the mid-1960s.

Device packaging and specifications
The 2N3906 is manufactured in a plastic TO-92 case. When looking at the flat side with the leads pointed downward, the three leads emerging from the case are, from left to right, the emitter, base, and collector leads.

The 2N3906 is specified by a collector current of 200 mA, collector-base and collector-emitter voltages of 40 V, for power dissipation of 300 mW. Its transition frequency Ft is 250 MHz, with a beta of at least 100.

Part numbers
The 2N3904 (NPN) and 2N3906 (PNP) are complementary transistor pairs.  These transistors are available in package styles TO-92, SOT23, SOT223 with different prefixes.

See also
 2N2222, 2N2907
 2N3055
 BC108
 BC548
 KT315

References

Further reading
Historical Databooks
 Small-Signal Semiconductors Data Book, 1218 pages, 1987, Motorola.
 Transistor and Diode Data Book, 1236 pages, 1973, Texas Instruments.

External links

JEDEC standards
Commercial transistors
Bipolar transistors